HD 208487 b is an extrasolar planet located approximately 144 light-years away in the constellation of Grus, orbiting the star HD 208487. This planet has a minimum mass close to half that of Jupiter and is most probably a gas giant. The planet orbits the star in a close, eccentric orbit. One revolution takes 130 days to complete. This planet was discovered on September 16, 2004 by Tinney, Butler, and Marcy et al. using Doppler spectroscopy to measure the star's radial velocity changing over time as the planet revolves around its orbit.

The planet HD 208487 b is named Mintome. The name was selected in the NameExoWorlds campaign by Gabon, during the 100th anniversary of the IAU. Mintome, in the Fang tongue, is a mythical land where a brotherhood of brave men live.

References

External links 
 

Grus (constellation)
Exoplanets discovered in 2004
Giant planets
Exoplanets detected by radial velocity
Exoplanets with proper names